Hopewell is an unincorporated community in Somerset County, Maryland, United States. It is located at the southern intersection of Maryland routes 413 and 667. St. Peter's Methodist Episcopal Church was listed on the National Register of Historic Places in 1990.

See also
 Crisfield Municipal Airport

References

Unincorporated communities in Somerset County, Maryland
Unincorporated communities in Maryland